Howrah–Amritsar Express was an Express train of the Indian Railways connecting  in West Bengal and  of Punjab. It operated with 13049/13050 train numbers on daily basis. Eastern Railway cancelled its operations temporary from 19 May 2020 but its services again started after the pandemic.

Service

The 13005/Howrah–Amritsar Express had average speed of 55 km/hr and covered 1924 km in 44h 30m. 13006/Amritsar–Howrah Express had average speed of 55 km/hr and covered 1924 km in 45h 35m.

Route and halts 

The important halts of the train were:

Deen Dayal Upadhyaya Junction, Lucknow, Moradabad, Najibabad, Laksar, Roorkee, Yamunanagar-Jagadhri,  to

Coach composition

The train had LHB rakes with max speed of 160 kmph. The train consisted of 24 coaches:

  Half First Class
 One and half Second Class
 Eight Third Class
 Twelve Sleeper Class
 2 Second-class Luggage/parcel van

Traction

Both trains were hauled by a Howrah Loco Shed-based WAP-7 electric locomotive from Howrah to Amritsar.

See also 

 Howrah railway station
 Amritsar Junction railway station
 Durgiana Express

Notes

External links 

 13049/Howrah–Amritsar Express
 13050/Amritsar–Howrah Express

References 

Rail transport in Howrah
Transport in Amritsar
Express trains in India
Rail transport in West Bengal
Rail transport in Jharkhand
Rail transport in Bihar
Rail transport in Uttar Pradesh
Rail transport in Haryana
Rail transport in Punjab, India